The 2017–18 Texas Tech Lady Raiders basketball team represents Texas Tech University in the 2017–18 NCAA Division I women's basketball season. The Lady Raiders were led by fifth year head coach Candi Whitaker until she was replaced by interim head coach Shimmy Gray-Miller on January 1, 2018. They play their homes games at United Supermarkets Arena and are members of the Big 12 Conference. They finished the season 7–23, 1–17 in Big 12 play to finish in last place. They lost in the first round of the Big 12 women's tournament to Iowa State.

Previous season
They finished the season 14–17, 5–13 in Big 12 play to finish in eighth place. They advanced to the quarterfinals of the Big 12 women's tournament where they lost to Baylor.

Media

Television & Radio information
Select Lady Raiders games will be shown on FSN affiliates throughout the season, including FSSW, FSSW+, and FCS Atlantic, Central, and Pacific. All games will be broadcast on the Lady Raiders Radio Network on either KLZK or KJTV.

Roster

Schedule

|-
!colspan=12 style=| Exhibition

|-
!colspan=12 style=| Non-conference regular season

|-
!colspan=12 style=| Big 12 regular season

|-
!colspan=12 style=|  Big 12 Women's Tournament

See also
2017–18 Texas Tech Red Raiders basketball team

References

Texas Tech Lady Raiders basketball seasons
Texas Tech